The Battle of North Point was fought on September 12, 1814, between General John Stricker's Maryland Militia and a British force led by Major General Robert Ross. Although the Americans retreated, they were able to do so in good order having inflicted significant casualties on the British, killing one of the commanders of the invading force, significantly demoralizing the troops under his command and leaving some of his units lost among woods and swampy creeks, with others in confusion. This combination prompted British colonel Arthur Brooke to delay his advance against Baltimore, buying valuable time to properly prepare for the defense of the city as Stricker retreated back to the main defenses to bolster the existing force. The engagement was a part of the larger Battle of Baltimore, an American victory in the War of 1812.

Background

British movements
Major General Robert Ross had been dispatched to Chesapeake Bay with a brigade of veterans from the Duke of Wellington's army early in 1814, reinforced with a battalion of Royal Marines. He had defeated a hastily assembled force of Maryland and District of Columbia militia at the Battle of Bladensburg on August 24, 1814, and burned Washington. Having disrupted the American government, he withdrew to the waiting ships of the Royal Navy at the mouth of the Patuxent River before heading further up the Chesapeake Bay to the strategically more important port city of Baltimore, although the Americans managed to defeat a British landing at Caulk's Field before doing so.

Ross's army of 3,700 troops and 1,000 marines landed at North Point at the end of the peninsula between the Patapsco River and the Back River on the morning of September 12, 1814, and began moving toward the city of Baltimore.

American defenses
Major General Samuel Smith of the Maryland militia anticipated the British move, and dispatched Brigadier General John Stricker's column to meet them. Stricker's force consisted of five regiments of Maryland militia, a small militia cavalry regiment from Maryland, a battalion of three volunteer rifle companies and a battery of six 4-pounder field guns. Stricker deployed his brigade halfway between Hampstead Hill, just outside Baltimore, where there were earthworks and artillery emplacements, and North Point. At that point, several tidal creeks narrowed the peninsula to only a mile wide, and it was considered an ideal spot for opposing the British before they reached the main American defensive positions.

Stricker received intelligence that the British were camped at a farm just  from his headquarters. He deployed his men between Bear Creek and Bread and Cheese Creek, which offered cover from nearby woods, and had a long wooden fence near the main road. Stricker placed the 5th Maryland Regiment and the 27th Maryland Regiment and his six guns in the front defensive line, with two regiments (the 51st and 39th) in support, and one more (the 6th) in reserve. He placed his men in mutually supporting positions, relying on numerous swamps and the two streams to stop a British flank attack, all of which he hoped would help avoid another disaster such as Bladensburg.

The riflemen initially occupied a position some miles ahead of Stricker's main position, to delay the British advance. However, their commander, Captain William Dyer, hastily withdrew on hearing a rumour that British troops were landing from the Back River behind him, threatening to cut off his retreat. Stricker posted them instead on his right flank.

Battle

Opening skirmish
At about midday on the 12th, Stricker heard the British had halted while the soldiers had a meal, and some sailors attached to Ross's force plundered nearby farms. He decided it would be better to provoke a fight rather than wait for a possible British night attack. At 1:00 pm, he sent Major Richard Heath with 250 men and one cannon to draw the British to Stricker's main force.

Heath advanced down the road and soon began to engage the British pickets. When Ross heard the fighting, he quickly left his meal and ran to the scene. His men attempted to drive out the concealed American riflemen. Rear Admiral George Cockburn, second in command of the Royal Navy' American Station who usually accompanied Ross, was cautious about advancing without more support and Ross agreed that he would leave and bring back the main army. However, Ross never got the chance, as an American rifleman shot him in the chest. Mortally wounded, Ross turned command over to Colonel Arthur Brooke and died soon after.

Main battle
Brooke reorganized the British troops and prepared to assault the American positions at 3:00 pm. He decided to use his three cannon to cover an attempt by his 4th Regiment to get around the American flank, while two more regiments and the naval brigade would assault the American center. The British frontal assault took heavy casualties as the American riflemen fired into the British ranks, and lacking canister the Americans loaded their cannon with broken locks, nails and horseshoes, firing scrap metal at the British advance. Nevertheless, the British 4th Regiment managed to outflank the American positions and sent many of the American regiments fleeing. Stricker was able to conduct an organized retreat, with his men firing volleys as they continued to fall back. This proved effective, killing one of the British commanders and leaving some units lost among woods and swampy creeks, with others in confusion.

Not all the militia regiments performed with equal distinction. The 51st Regiment and some men of the 39th broke and ran under fire. However, the 5th and 27th held their ground and retreated in good order, having inflicted significant casualties on the enemy. Only one American gun was lost.

Corporal John McHenry of the 5th Regiment wrote of the battle:

Our Regiment, the 5th, carried off the praise from the other regiments engaged, so did the company to which I have the honor to belong cover itself with glory. When compared to the [other] Regiments we were the last that left the ground... had our Regiment not retreated at the time it did we should have been cut off in two minutes.

Brooke did not follow the retreating Americans. He had advanced to within a mile of the main American position, but he had suffered heavier casualties than the Americans. As it was getting dark, he chose to wait until Fort McHenry was expected to be neutralized, while Stricker withdrew to Baltimore's main defences.

Casualties
The official British Army casualty report, signed by Major Henry Debbeig, gives 39 killed and 251 wounded. Of these, 28 killed and 217 wounded belonged to the British Army; 6 killed and 20 wounded belonged to the 2nd and 3rd Battalions of the Royal Marines; 4 killed and 11 wounded belonged to the contingents of Royal Marines detached from Cockburn's fleet; and 1 killed (Elias Taylor) and 3 wounded belonged to the Royal Marine Artillery. As was normal, the Royal Navy submitted a separate casualty return for the engagement, signed by Rear-Admiral Cockburn, which gives 4 sailors killed and 28 wounded but contradicts the British Army casualty report by giving 3 killed (1 and 2 from HMS Madagascar and HMS Ramillies respectively) and 15 wounded for the Royal Marines detached from the ships of the Naval fleet. A subsequent casualty return from Cochrane to the Admiralty, dated 22 September 1814, gives 6 sailors killed, 1 missing and 32 wounded, with Royal Marines casualties of 1 killed and 16 wounded.  The total British losses, as officially reported, were 43 killed and 279 wounded; 42 killed and 283 wounded; or 44 killed, 287 wounded and 1 missing: depending upon which of the versions of the casualty returns was accurate. Historian Franklin R. Mullaly gives still another version of the British casualties, 46 killed and 295 wounded, despite using these same sources. The American loss was 24 killed, 139 wounded and 50 taken prisoner.

Aftermath

The battle had been costly for the British. Apart from the other casualties, losing General Ross was a critical blow to the British. He was a respected leader of British forces in the Peninsular War and the War of 1812. Ross's death proved a blow to British morale as well. The combined effect of the blow suffered at North Point and the failure of the Royal Navy to capture or get past Fort McHenry at the entrance to Baltimore harbor, despite a 25-hour bombardment, proved to be the turning point of the Battle of Baltimore. During the bombardment on Fort McHenry, Francis Scott Key was detained on a British ship at the entrance to Baltimore and penned the words to "The Star-Spangled Banner".

The day after the battle, Brooke advanced cautiously towards Baltimore. There was no more opposition from Stricker, but when the British came into view of the main defenses of Baltimore, Brooke estimated them to be manned by up to 22,000 militia, with 100 cannon. He prepared to make a night assault against the defenses at Loudenslager Hill, but asked Vice Admiral Alexander Cochrane to send boats and bomb ketches to silence an American battery, "Roger's Bastion", on the flank of his proposed attack. Despite a stiff fight between the boats, commanded by Captain Charles John Napier and the American batteries, the Bastion was unharmed and Brooke called off the attack and withdrew before dawn. The British re-embarked at North Point.

Legacy
The battle is commemorated through the Maryland state holiday of Defenders Day, as well as on the patch of the Baltimore County Sheriff's Office. The lineage of the 5th Maryland is perpetuated by the 175th Infantry Regiment (MD ARNG), one of nineteen Army National Guard units with campaign credit for the War of 1812.

The Maryland Museum of Military History, housed in the Fifth Regiment Armory in Baltimore, Maryland, features an exhibit on the Battle of Baltimore which was installed to mark the 200th anniversary of the battle.

Notes

References and further reading
 
 
 
 
 
 
 
 
 
McCavitt, John, and Christopher T. George. The Man Who Captured Washington: Major General Robert Ross and the War of 1812. Norman: University of Oklahoma Press, 2016.  see online review

External links

Detailed Study of the Battle of North Point by John Pezzola
National Guard Heritage Series painting at the United States Army Center of Military History
Society of the War of 1812
Wells & McComas
Surgeon's Journal of HM troop ship Diomede. (Archive reference ADM 101/96/6 parts 2-5) Transcription of 'Folios 16-17: list of men wounded at Chesapeake on 13 September 1814'

1814 in the United States
Battles of the War of 1812
History of Maryland
Battles involving the United Kingdom
Maryland in the War of 1812
1814 in Maryland
Conflicts in 1814